Isokichi Komine (18663 October 1934) was an Australian pearl diver, merchant, and trader. One of German New Guinea's earliest emigrants, he is known as "one of Rabaul's oldest pioneers".

Early life
"[O]ne of Rabaul's oldest pioneers", Komine was born in 1866 or 1867, in Shimabara, Nagasaki, Japan. First working as a factory worker in Korea, he had already begun voyaging New Guinea's seas in the 1890s and first settled at Thursday Island, Queensland. An emigrant of Japan, Komine was the first recorded Japanese presence in German New Guinea; he arrived there in 1901 or 1902, after being denied permanent residency in British New Guinea (now Papua).

Career and death
Komine is said to be "the most famous Japanese resident in the region [German New Guinea] of that time". A Japanese community leader in German New Guinea, Komine set up Nanyō Sangyō Kaisha, an independent business, there, and employed up over a hundred Japanese workers. An extensive collection of Komine's rare finds in his voyages comprised more than 3,000 "valuables", although it was noted that a few gold-lip ouster shells in his collection were only worth up to $5. The collection was sold in October 1910 to A. B. Lewis, and is considered to be the largest single purchase of items from the Bismarck Archipelago, which was where Komine resided in from 1902. When Japan declared war against Germany in 1914, Komine aligned with the Australians but also maintained close ties with German businesspeople to safeguard his business interests. Komine died on 3 October 1934 of food poisoning, although one report claims that Komine "outlived his obituary notice" and was still alive after 1934.

See also

 Japanese settlement in Papua New Guinea

Notes

References

1867 births
1934 deaths
People from Nagasaki Prefecture
Pearlers
20th-century Japanese businesspeople
20th century in German New Guinea
Colonial people of German New Guinea